Podlechy  (German Podlechen) is a village in the administrative district of Gmina Korsze, within Kętrzyn County, Warmian-Masurian Voivodeship, in northern Poland.

The village has a population of 217.

Notable residents
Karl Löwrick (1894-1945), Wehrmacht general

References

Villages in Kętrzyn County